{{Album ratings
| rev1      =About.com
| rev1Score = (favorable)
|rev2=Allmusic|rev2Score= 
|rev3=Austin Chronicle|rev3Score=(favorable)
|rev4=Country Music|rev4Score=(mixed)
|rev5=Daily O'Collegian |rev5Score=(favorable)
|rev6=Dirty Linen |rev6Score=(favorable)
|rev7=Goldmine |rev7Score=(favorable)<ref name = "GM">Fetzer Mills Jr., "New Releases", Goldmine, 27:20:553, October 5, 2001, p.20</ref>
|rev8= The Music Box|rev8Score= 
|rev9=NetRhythms |rev9Score=(favorable)
|rev10=New York Times |rev10Score=(mixed)
|rev11=Performing Songwriter |rev11Score=(favorable)
|rev12=Sing Out! |rev12Score=(favorable)|noprose=yes}}Gravitational Forces''' is an album by Texas-based country/folk singer-songwriter Robert Earl Keen.  It was first released in the United States on August 7, 2001, on Lost Highway Records.

One reviewer described this album, Keen's ninth, as being "just a hair more to the country side of the folk-rock-country axis than ever before." Indeed, producer and multi-instrumentalist Gurf Morlix, and the various long-time members of Keen's own road band did not shy away from including fiddle solos and steel guitars in the mix when they suit Keen's songs.  "I wanted to keep a real natural, organic sound," says Morlix, "My job as producer varies from artist to artist. I help them find the sound they want and then do what it takes to get that on record."

As usual, Keen's songwriting is full of narrative stories and character sketches.  A review in Performing Songwriter magazine described the characters found in Gravitational Forces as "everyday people pulled, led, and sometimes dragged by some outside strength."  Billboard noted, however, that Keen's more recent tales avoid some of the violent imagery found in some of his earlier songs.  Keen has admitted, "Yeah, the body count's a little lower this time."Compare these songs to e.g. "Whenever Kindness Fails" or "Blow You Away" from 1993's A Bigger Piece of Sky

Keen began recording the album after his previous label, Arista Austin had closed down, and before finding his new, albeit brief, home on Lost Highway Records.  "When we started this project I hadn't made a deal with any record company," Keen says, "I just knew I would have a deal one way or another." The release arrived at a time when Keen was beginning to receive wider recognition outside of his home state of Texas."Austin City Limits Interviews: Robert Earl Keen", pbs.org, August 22, 2001 It peaked at No. 10 on Billboard's Top Country Albums chart, later matched by his 2015 album Happy Prisoner:The Bluegrass Sessions as Keen's highest ranked albums on that chart.

 Song selection 
The songs on the album that Keen did not write range from Johnny Cash's often-covered classic, "I Still Miss Someone" to Townes Van Zandt's more obscure "Snowin' on Raton".  Keen and his band also cover the traditional blues, "Walkin' Cane" in what has been described as a "rowdy, back-porch take," and treat Terry Allen's "High Plains Jamboree" with a backdrop of "bar room party sounds."

The cover that reviewers most recognize as a choice pick to match Keen and his career outside of mainstream music is Joe Dolce's "Hall of Fame". Keen sings:
{|
|-
|My Home ain't in the hall of fame|-
|You can go there you won't find my name|-
|And my songs don't belong on top forty radio|-
|I'll keep the old back forty for my home.|}

Keen's own songs provide many of the album's highlights.  "Wild Wind" is a harmonica-heavy minor key introduction to a series of tragic small-town characters, that will leave some listeners wanting to know more. Keen says that some of the characters that populate his songs are based upon "dead on real people" while others are composites.  In "Wild Wind", he says, "there's a character that just sort of walks around town and sells papers.  He's a mixture of about three or four guys that I know... In general I try to keep with real people, because I feel like you always want to have some hint of the truth where it makes it feel real to you."

"Not a Drop of Rain" is Keen's personal favorite from the album, "It's a very emotional song, written out of thinking what would happen if I lost everything I have." The song has a somewhat unusual guitar accompaniment played in DADGAD tuning and its structure eschews the traditional verse/chorus/verse song structure.  Singer-songwriter Shawn Colvin fell in love with the song and began performing it. Her version was recorded in studio and released in 2002 on a compilation by radio station KGSR.

Keen's "Goin' Nowhere Blues" has been described as "chilling" and contains references to Langston Hughes, Woody Guthrie, Martin Luther King Jr., Cesar Chavez, and down-and-out union workers.  Keen manages to connect the tragic aspects of all these disparate lives.

The title track, "Gravitational Forces", has been described as "sort of experimental" by some and "bizarre" or "hysterical" by others.  Keen delivers a spoken stream of consciousness on the "temporal distortion of a four-hour soundcheck," complete with a free jazz accompaniment that caused one reviewer to liken it to Allen Ginsberg's reading of "Howl" backed by the Kronos Quartet.

Although one reviewer indicates that the closing track is Keen's first studio release of his own live signature song, "The Road Goes On Forever", Keen first recorded the song for his 1989 album West Textures.  In the earlier recording the track was five minutes long, just enough to relate the plot twists in Keen's story.  This time it's a seven-minute build-up to some intense and lengthy instrumental solos.

In an August 2001 taping of Austin City Limits, Keen and his band gave a live performance including many of these same songs.  This was released in 2004 as the album, Live From Austin, TX''.

Track listing
All tracks written by Robert Earl Keen, except where noted.
"My Home Ain't in the Hall of Fame" (Joe Dolce) – 3:04
 Robert Earl Keen — lead vocals
 Rich Brotherton — acoustic & electric lead guitars
 Bill Whitbeck – bass guitar & harmony vocals
 Gurf Morlix — steel, electric & baritone guitars and harmony vocals
 Tom Van Schaik – drums
"Hello New Orleans" – 3:01
 Robert Earl Keen – lead vocals
 Rich Brotherton – acoustic, electric & 12-string guitars
 Ian McLagan — Hammond B-3 organ
 Gurf Morlix — beer bottle slide guitar
 Bill Whitbeck — upright bass & harmony vocals
 Tom Van Schaik – drums
"Wild Wind" – 5:12
 Robert Earl Keen – lead vocals
 Rich Brotherton – acoustic guitar & harmony vocals
 Bill Whitbeck – bass guitar, harmony vocals, harmony concept & vocal arrangement
 Gurf Morlix – acoustic & baritone guitars
 Cody Braun – harmonica
 Tom Van Schaik – drums
"Not a Drop of Rain" – 4:09
 Robert Earl Keen – lead vocals
 Rich Brotherton – acoustic guitar
 Bill Whitbeck – bass guitar & harmony vocals
 Bryan Duckworth — mandolin
 Gurf Morlix – beer bottle slide guitar
 Ian McLagan – Hammond B-3 organ
 Tom Van Schaik – drums
"I Still Miss Someone" (Johnny Cash, Roy Cash) – 3:19
 Robert Earl Keen – lead vocals
 Rich Brotherton – acoustic & electric guitars and harmony vocals
 Bill Whitbeck – bass guitar & harmony vocals
 Bryan Duckworth — fiddle & mandolin
 Tom Van Schaik – drums
"Fallin' Out" – 3:25
 Robert Earl Keen – lead vocals
 Rich Brotherton – acoustic guitar
 Bill Whitbeck – bass guitar & harmony vocals
 Gurf Morlix – electric & lap steel guitars and harmonium
 Tom Van Schaik – drums & percussion
"High Plains Jamboree" (Terry Allen) – 3:10
 Robert Earl Keen – lead vocals
 Rich Brotherton – acoustic, electric & baritone guitars
 Bill Whitbeck – bass guitar & tic-tac bass guitar
 Tommy Delamore – steel guitar
 Byran Duckworth – fiddle
 Tom Van Schaik – drums
 "Bar Room Party Sound" — Kathy Brotherton, Rich Brotherton, Gurf Morlix, Laurie Galbraith & Robert Earl Keen
"Walkin' Cane" (traditional, arranged by Robert Earl Keen) – 4:43
 Robert Earl Keen – lead vocals
 Rich Brotherton – slide, electric & National slide guitars guitars and harmony vocals
 Bill Whitbeck – upright bass & harmony vocals
 Bryan Duckworth – fiddle
 Gurf Morlix – mandolin
 Tom Van Schaik – drums & percussion
"Goin' Nowhere Blues" – 4:47
 Robert Earl Keen – lead vocals
 Rich Brotherton – acoustic guitar
 Bill Whitbeck – upright bass
 Ian McLagan – Hammond B-3 organ
 Gurf Morlix – acoustic & electric guitars
 Tom Van Schaik – drums & percussion
"Snowin' on Raton" (Townes Van Zandt) – 5:01
 Robert Earl Keen – lead vocals
 Rich Brotherton – electricguitar & harmony vocals
 Bill Whitbeck – bass guitar & harmony vocals
 Marty Muse – steel guitar
 Freddie Fletcher — pizza box percussion
"Gravitational Forces" – 2:41
 Robert Earl Keen – lead vocals
 Rich Brotherton – acoustic guitar
 Bill Whitbeck – bass guitar
 Tom Van Schaik – drums & percussion
"The Road Goes On Forever" – 7:10 †
 Robert Earl Keen – lead vocals
 Rich Brotherton – electric & baritone guitars and mandolin
 Bill Whitbeck – bass
 Ray Kennedy — electric guitar
 Marty Muse – steel guitar
 Tom Van Schaik – drums

Credits

Production 
 Produced by Gurf Morlix & Robert Earl Keen
 Recorded by Stuart Sullivan at Arlyn Studios, Austin, Texas
 Mixed by Gurf Morlix at Arlyn Studios, Austin, Texas
 Mastered by Hank Williams and Gurf Morlix at MasterMix, Nashville, Tennessee
† "The Road Goes on Forever" produced by Ray Kennedy
 Recorded by Ray Kennedy at Arlyn Studios, Austin, Texas
 Additional recording at Room and Board Studios, Nashville, Tennessee
 Mixed by Chuck Ainlay in BackStage at Sound Stage Studios, Nashville, Tennessee
 Mastered by Hank Williams at MasterMix, Nashville, Tennessee

Management 
 Management – Rosetta Management, Bandera, Texas
 Booking — Monterey Peninsula Artists, Inc.

Artwork 
 Art direction — Robert Earl Keen, Jim Kemp & Karen Naff
 Design – Karen Naff
 Photography – Glen Rose

Chart performance

References 

2001 albums
Robert Earl Keen albums
Lost Highway Records albums